is a Japanese singer and dancer. He is a vocalist of the Japanese all-male dance and music group Generations from Exile Tribe. Ryuto is represented with LDH.

Biography 
To achieve his dream of becoming a singer, Ryuto dropped out of high school and attended Osaka's EXPG while doing part-time jobs.

In February 2010, he participated in VOCAL BATTLE AUDITION 2 ~Yume wo Motta Wakamono-tachi e~ arranged by Exile to become a member of Sandaime J Soul Brothers but lost in the final round (alongside groupmate Ryota Katayose).

On July 19, 2011, Ryuto was selected as a candidate for GENERATIONS, and on April 17, 2012, he was announced as an official member. Generations from Exile Tribe made their major debut on November 21, 2012, with the single "Brave It Out".

In 2013, he participated in Fuji TV's Kendama competition "Geinoukai Tokugiou Ketteisen Teppen" and managed to win the first place.

In 2016, Ryuto made his debut as a voice actor for the Japanese dubbing of the American superhero TV show Legends of Tomorrow. He would be in charge of voicing Grant Wilson / Second Generation Death Stroke.

In November 2018, he was chosen as one of the ambassadors for LDH Martial Arts' "ENERGY PROJECT" which advertises different fitness supplies from LDH's original brand alongside fellow Generations member Alan Shirahama and E-girls members Karen Fujii and Anna Suda.

On September 21, 2019, he collaborated with fashion brand 24karats for the second time to release a collection of sportswear titled NO PAIN NO GAIN. On October 3 in the same year, Ryuto made his solo debut with the digital single "Nostalgie", which was used in the movie HiGH&LOW: THE WORST. On the same day, he opened a personal Instagram account, being the last member of Generations to do so.

On March 4, 2020, he will release his second solo song "Mou ichido kimi to odoritai" (もう一度君と踊りたい; I want to dance with you again) which will be used in the play of the same name from LDH's BOOK ACT.

Discography

Digital singles

Lyrics

Filmography

Live

TV series

Radio

Advertisements

Voice dubbing 

 Legend of Tomorrow (2016) – Grant Wilson / Second Generation Death Stroke (Jamie Andrew Cutler)

References

External links 
 Official Website (in English)

1992 births
Living people
LDH (company) artists
21st-century Japanese singers
Musicians from Hyōgo Prefecture
21st-century Japanese male singers
People from Amagasaki